was the twenty-eighth of the sixty-nine stations of the Nakasendō highway connecting Edo with Kyoto during the Edo period. It was located in the present-day town of Nagawa, in the Chiisagata District of Nagano Prefecture, Japan.

History
Wada-shuku was approximately 49 ri, 24 chō from the starting point of the Nakasendō at Nihonbashi, or about 195 kilometers.

Most of the town was destroyed by a fire in 1861 and rebuilt. Presently, there are remains of both the honjin and original houses, which are being restored and preserved. The area is a tourist attraction for Nagawa town. The area has also long been known for its vast resources of obsidian, which have been exploited since the Jōmon period.

Wada-shuku in The Sixty-nine Stations of the Kiso Kaidō
Hiroshige's ukiyo-e print of Wada-shuku dates from 1835–1838. The print depicts an exaggerated view of Wada Pass in wintertime, with Mount Ontake appearing in the upper right corner.

References

External links
Hiroshige Kiso-Kaido series
on Kiso Kaido Road

Neighboring Post Towns
Nakasendō
Nagakubo-shuku - Wada-shuku - Shimosuwa-shuku

References

Stations of the Nakasendō
Stations of the Nakasendo in Nagano Prefecture
Shinano Province